Camogie is an Irish stick-and-ball team sport played by women. Camogie is played by 100,000 women in Ireland and worldwide, largely among Irish communities.

A variant of the game of hurling (which is played by men only), it is organised by the Dublin-based Camogie Association or An Cumann Camógaíochta. The annual All Ireland Camogie Championship has a record attendance of 33,154, while average attendances in recent years are in the region of 15,000 to 18,000. The final is broadcast live, with a TV audience of as many as over 300,000.

UNESCO lists Camogie as an element of Intangible Cultural Heritage. The game is referenced in Waiting for Godot by Irish playwright Samuel Beckett.

Game and rules
The game consists of two thirty-minute halves. There is a half-time interval of 15 minutes. In event of extra time, halves must consist of 10 minutes each. Each team has 15 players on the field. Within the 15 players the team must consist of one goalkeeper, three full back players, three half back players, two centre-field players, three half forward players and three full forward players. There is a minimum requirement of 12 players on the pitch at all times. The rules are almost identical to hurling, with a few exceptions.

Goalkeepers wear the same colours as outfield players. This is because no special rules apply to the goalkeeper and so there is no need for officials to differentiate between goalkeeper and outfielders.
A camogie player can hand pass a point over the bar from play (hand passing a goal is forbidden in Camogie since 2021 and forbidden in hurling since 1980).
Camogie games last 60 minutes, two 30-minute halves (senior inter-county hurling games last 70, which is two 35-minute halves). Ties are resolved by multiple 2×10-minute sudden death extra time periods; in these, the first team to score wins.
A smaller sliotar (ball) is used in camogie – commonly known as a size 4 sliotar – whereas hurlers play with a size 5 sliotar.
If a defending player hits the sliotar wide, a 45-metre puck is awarded to the opposition (in hurling, it is a 65-metre puck).
After a score, the goalkeeper pucks out from the 13-metre line (in hurling, he must puck from the end line).
The metal band on the camogie stick must be covered with tape (not necessary in hurling).
Side-to-side charges are forbidden (permitted in hurling).
Two points are awarded for a score direct from a sideline cut (since March 2012).
 Players must wear skirts or skorts rather than shorts.

Under the original 1903 rules both the match and the field were shorter than their hurling equivalents. From 1929 until 1979 a second crossbar, a "points bar" was also used, meaning that a point would not be allowed if it travelled over this bar, a somewhat contentious rule through the 75 years it was in use. Teams were regulated at 12 a side, using an elliptical formation, although it was more a "squeezed lemon" formation with the three midfield players grouped more closely together than their counterpart on the half back and half-forward lines. In 1999 camogie moved to the Gaelic Athletic Association (GAA) field-size and 15-a-side, adopting the standard GAA butterfly formation.

Field and equipment

Field

Sticks
The length of the stick, called a "hurley", varies depending on the player's height.

Goals and scoring

H-shaped goals are used. A team achieves a score by making the ball go between the posts. If the ball goes over the bar for a "point", the team earns one point. If the ball goes under the bar for a "goal", the team earns three points.

History

Foundation

The name was invented by Tadhg Ua Donnchadha (Tórna) at meetings in 1903 in advance of the first matches in 1904. The term camogie is derived from the name of the stick used in the game. Men play hurling using a curved stick called a camán in Irish. Women in the early camogie games used a shorter stick described by the diminutive form camóg. The suffix -aíocht (originally "uidheacht") was added to both words to give names for the sports: camánaíocht (which became iománaíocht) and camógaíocht. When the Gaelic Athletic Association was founded in 1884 the English-origin name "hurling" was given to the men's game. When an organisation for women was set up in 1904, it was decided to anglicise the Irish name camógaíocht to camogie.

The experimental rules were drawn up for the female game by Máire Ní Chinnéide, Seán (Sceilg) Ó Ceallaigh, Tadhg Ó Donnchadha and Séamus Ó Braonáin. The Official Launch of Camogie took place with the first public match between Craobh an Chéitinnigh (Keatings branch of the Gaelic League) and Cúchulainns on 17 July at a Feis in Navan. The sport's governing body, the Camogie Association or An Cumann Camógaíochta was founded in 1905 and re-constituted in 1911, 1923 and 1939. Until June 2010 it was known as Cumann Camógaíochta na nGael.

Máire Ní Chinnéide and Cáit Ní Dhonnchadha, two prominent Irish-language enthusiasts and cultural nationalists, were credited with having created the sport, with the assistance of Ní Dhonnchadha's scholarly brother Tadhg Ó Donnchadha, who drew up its rules. Thus, although camogie was founded by women, and independently run (although closely linked to the GAA), there was, from the outset, a small yet powerful male presence within its administrative ranks. It was no surprise that camogie emanated from the Gaelic League, nor that it would be dependent upon the structures and networks provided by that organisation during the initial expansion of the sport. Of all the cultural nationalist organisations for adults that emerged during the fin de siècle, the Gaelic League was the only one to accept female and male members on an equal footing.

Leagues

Ireland
An Cumann Camógaíochta has a similar structure to the Gaelic Athletic Association, with an Annual Congress every spring which decides on policy and major issues such as rule changes, and an executive council, the Árd Chómhairle which deals with short-term issues and governance. The game is administered from a headquarters in Croke Park in Dublin. Each of 28 county boards takes control of its own affairs (all of the Irish counties except Fermanagh, Leitrim and Sligo), with the number of clubs ranging from 58 in Cork to one in Leitrim. There are four provincial councils and affiliates in Asia, Australia, Britain, Europe, New York, New Zealand and North America.

Clubs

Ireland

There are 539 camogie clubs, of which 513 are based on the island of Ireland, 47 in Connacht, 196 in Leinster, 160 in Munster, and 110 in Ulster.

Connacht
There are 47 camogie teams in Connacht.

Leinster
There are 196 camogie teams in Leinster.

Munster
There are 160 camogie teams in Munster.

Ulster
There are 110 camogie teams in Ulster.

Overseas
  Europe 4
  London 7
  New South Wales 5
  Toronto 2
  United States 7
  Western Australia 1

Competitions in Ireland

All-Ireland Championship

The county is the unit of structure in elite competition, responsible for organising club competitions within the county unit and for fielding inter-county teams in the various grades of the All-Ireland championships and National Camogie League. The All Ireland Club Championship is staged at Senior, Intermediate and Junior level, usually reaching the final stages in November–December or the following March. London competed in the National Camogie League in the 2010 season, but not in 2011.

Counties compete for the elite All-Ireland Senior Camogie Championship in which the O'Duffy Cup is awarded. The All-Ireland Final is held every year in Croke Park during September, usually on the week between the hurling final and Gaelic football final, and attracts attendances of up to 33,000.

There are age-graded All Ireland championships at Minor A, Minor B, and Minor C, and Under-16 A, B and C level.

Six teams contest the fourth-tier Nancy Murray Cup (or Junior A championship), Carlow, Cavan, Monaghan, Tyrone, Westmeath, and the second team of Offaly.

Three teams contest the fifth-tier Máire Ní Chinnéide Cup, (or Junior B championship), Wicklow, and the second teams of Kildare and Meath.

Although six counties do not compete at adult level: Donegal, Fermanagh, Leitrim, Longford, Mayo and Sligo do not compete at adult level, clubs from Fermanagh, Kerry and Mayo have won honours and Donegal have contested divisional finals at under-14 Feile na nGael level. Both Louth (in 1934 and 1936) and Mayo (in 1959) have contested the All Ireland senior final in the past.

National League
The National League is staged during the winter-spring months, with four divisions of team graded by ability.

Provincial championships
Provincial championships take place at all levels, independent of the All Ireland series which has been run on an open draw basis since 1973.

International and inter-provincial
Ireland plays a camogie-shinty international against Scotland each year. The Gael Linn Cup is an inter-provincial competition played at senior and junior level. The sport is closely associated with the Celtic Congress. Two former Camogie Association presidents Máire Ní Chinnéide and Agnes O'Farrelly were also presidents of Celtic Congress and exhibition matches have been held at the Celtic Congress since 1938. The first such exhibition match, on the Isle of Man in 1938, marked the first appearance of Kathleen Cody, who became one of the stars of the 1940s.

Inter-collegiate
The Ashbourne and Purcell Cups and Father Meachair seven-a-side are the principal inter-collegiate competitions.

Schools
There is also a programme of provincial and All Ireland championships at secondary schools senior and junior levels, differentiated by the years of secondary school cycle, with years 4–6 competing in the senior competition, and years 1–3 competing at junior level. Cumann na mBunscoil organises competitions at primary school level.

Féile na nGael
Camogie competitions for club teams featuring under-14 players are played in four divisions as part of the annual Féile na nGael festival. The county that is selected for a particular year, all their clubs host teams from all around the country representing their county. Host clubs get families to take in two or three children for a couple of days.

International presence

Though camogie is played predominantly in its native homeland of Ireland, it has spread to other countries, largely among the Irish diaspora due to immigrants and the immigrant population. The sport is known to have arrived in places in such as Great Britain, North America, Europe, Australia, New Zealand, South Africa and Argentina.

In North America camogie is played in the United States, Canada, and in parts of the Caribbean. Camogie has also been included as a part of the GAA World Games.

GAA World Games

2019 Renault GAA World Games
Renault GAA World Games - Camogie (Native Born)

North American presence
Camogie teams in North America have existed for at least a century.

United States

The national organizing body for Gaelic Games in the United States, with the exception of New York City, is the USGAA where camogie can be found. It is the governing body which promotes camogie in the United States along with other Gaelic sports. The USGAA also maintains a close relationship with other GAA groups in North America including Canada (Gaelic Games Canada), the New York GAA, and the Caribbean.

GAA World Games

The United States has sent a number of camogie teams from the US to compete in the GAA World Games in 2016 and 2019.

Canada

The national organizing body for Gaelic Games in Canada is Gaelic Games Canada (GGC)  Canadian GAA (CGAA) where camogie can be found. Canada and the CGAA are home to a number of camogie clubs.

Clubs

GAA World Games
Canada has sent a number of camogie teams from Canada to compete in the GAA World Games in 2016 and 2019.

Records

Ireland

All-Ireland Senior Camogie Championship
Cork have won the most Camogie All-Ireland titles with 28, the last being in 2018.

National Camogie League titles
Cork have won the most National Camogie League titles with 16.

Results

2018 All Ireland Championship
Eleven counties competed for the elite All-Ireland Senior Camogie Championship in 2018: Clare, Cork, Dublin, Galway, Kilkenny, Limerick, Meath, Offaly, Tipperary, Waterford, and Wexford.

Eleven teams contested the second-tier Jack McGrath Cup in 2018 (All Ireland intermediate championship): Antrim, Carlow, Derry, Down, Kildare, Laois, and Westmeath, and the second teams of Cork, Galway, Kilkenny, and Tipperary.

Seven teams contested the third-tier Kay Mills Cup (All Ireland junior or 'Premier Junior" championship) in 2018: Armagh, Kerry, Roscommon, and the second teams of Clare, Dublin, Limerick, and Offaly.

Only fourteen points were scored by the winning team in the 2018 senior final, and most points in the game followed the awarding of frees. Ten points was sufficient to determine the winner of the 2017 senior final.

Awards
Camogie All Stars Awards are awarded annually to the elite players who have performed best in each of the 15 positions on a traditional camogie team. Player of the year and other achievement awards have also been awarded to leading players for several decades.

Team of the Century
Picked in 2004

Eileen Duffy-O'Mahony (Dublin)
Liz Neary (Kilkenny)
Marie Costine-O'Donovan (Cork)
Mary Sinnott-Dinan (Wexford)
Bridie Martin-McGarry (Kilkenny)
Sandie Fitzgibbon (Cork)
Margaret O'Leary-Leacy (Wexford)
Mairéad McAtamney-Magill (Antrim)
 Linda Mellerick (Cork)
 Sophie Brack (Dublin)
Kathleen Mills-Hill (Dublin)
Joni Traynor (Kilkenny)
Úna O'Connor (Dublin)
Pat Moloney-Lenihan (Cork)
Deirdre Hughes (Tipperary)
Angela Downey-Browne (Kilkenny)

Criticism

Partly due to biological and physiological differences between men and women, some argue that Camogie lacks the physical drama found in the male equivalent sport, hurling.

There are lower score tallies in the senior camogie championship finals than in comparison to men's hurling championships.

See also

 Ashbourne Cup
 Camogie All Stars Awards
 Poc Fada
 Women's shinty
 Field Hockey
 Bando (sport)
 Shinty
 Hurling
 Lacrosse

References

External links
 Official Camogie Association Website
 http://www.isscvancouver.com/camogie-2/ Irish Social and Sporting Club camogie teams in Vancouver, Canada

 
Gaelic games
Sports originating in Ireland
Women's team sports
Team sports